The 1969 All-Big Ten Conference football team consists of American football players chosen by various organizations for All-Big Ten Conference teams for the 1969 Big Ten Conference football season.

Offensive selections

Quarterbacks
 Mike Phipps, Purdue (AP-1; UPI-1)
 Rex Kern, Ohio State (AP-2; UPI-2)

Running backs
 John Isenbarger, Indiana (AP-1; UPI-1)
 Jim Otis, Ohio State (AP-1; UPI-1)
 Mike Adamle, Northwestern (AP-1)
 Billy Taylor, Michigan (AP-2; UPI-1)
 Stan Brown, Purdue (AP-2; UPI-2)
 James Carter, Minnesota (UPI-2)
 Barry Mayer, Minnesota (UPI-2)

Ends
 Jim Mandich, Michigan (AP-1; UPI-1)
 Ray Parson, Minnesota (AP-1)
 Jade Butcher, Indiana (AP-2; UPI-1)
 Jan White, Ohio State (AP-2; UPI-2)
 Ray Manning, Iowa (UPI-2)

Tackles
 Dan Dierdorf, Michigan (AP-1; UPI-1)
 Paul DeNuccio, Purdue (AP-1; UPI-2)
 Charles Hutchison, Ohio State (UPI-1)
 John Bradley, Northwestern (AP-2)
 Al Hawes, Minnesota (AP-2; UPI-2)

Guards
 Ron Saul, Michigan State (AP-1; UPI-1)
 Don DeSalle, Indiana (AP-1; UPI-2)
 Jon Meskimen, Iowa (AP-2; UPI-1)
 Alan Jack, Ohio State (AP-2; UPI-2)

Centers
 Brian Donovan, Ohio State (AP-1)
 Guy Murdock, Michigan (UPI-1)
 Walter Whitehead, Purdue (AP-2; UPI-2)

Defensive selections

Ends
 Dave Whitfield, Ohio State (AP-1; UPI-1)
 Mark Debeve, Ohio State (AP-1)
 Rich Saul, Michigan State (UPI-1)
 Bill McKoy, Purdue (AP-2; UPI-2)
 Cecil Pryor, Michigan (AP-2; UPI-2)

Tackles
 Paul Schmidlin, Ohio State (AP-1; UPI-1)
 Ron Curl, Michigan State (AP-1; UPI-2)
 Bill Yanchar, Purdue (AP-2; UPI-1)
 Bill Galler, Northwestern (AP-2)
 Layne McDowell, Iowa (UPI-2)

Middle guard
 Jim Stillwagon, Ohio State (AP-1; UPI-1)
 Henry Hill, Michigan (AP-2; UPI-2)

Linebackers
 Veno Paraskevas, Purdue (AP-1; UPI-1)
 Jack Tatum, Ohio State (AP-1; UPI-1 [def. back])
 Ralph Huff, Michigan (AP-1; UPI-2)
 Doug Adams, Ohio State (AP-2; UPI-1)
 Larry Ely, Iowa (AP-2)
 Don Law, Michigan State (AP-2; UPI-2)

Defensive backs
 Tom Curtis, Michigan (AP-1; UPI-1)
 Ted Provost, Ohio State (AP-1; UPI-1)
 Mike Sensibaugh, Ohio State (AP-1; UPI-1)
 Tim Foley, Purdue (AP-2; UPI-2)
 Craig Clemons, Iowa (AP-2)
 Jeff Wright, Minnesota (AP-2)
 Barry Pierson, Michigan (UPI-2)
 Tim Anderson, Ohio State (UPI-2)
 Walter Bowser, Minnesota (UPI-2)

Key
AP = Associated Press, selected by the AP's Midwest board of writers and TV-radio sportcasters

UPI = United Press International, selected by Big Ten coaches

Bold = Consensus first-team selection of the AP and UPI

See also
1969 College Football All-America Team

References

All-Big Ten Conference
All-Big Ten Conference football teams